The Tuapse constituency (No.49) is a Russian legislative constituency in Krasnodar Krai. The constituency most of Krasnodar Krai Black Sea coast, stretching from Novorossiysk to Tuapse, including resorts Gelendzhik and Goryachy Klyuch. During 2003 redistricting new Sochi-based Apsheronsk constituency was carved out of Tuapse constituency, however, the latter gained Novorossiysk from neighboring Novorossiysk constituency.

Members elected

Election results

1993

|-
! colspan=2 style="background-color:#E9E9E9;text-align:left;vertical-align:top;" |Candidate
! style="background-color:#E9E9E9;text-align:left;vertical-align:top;" |Party
! style="background-color:#E9E9E9;text-align:right;" |Votes
! style="background-color:#E9E9E9;text-align:right;" |%
|-
|style="background-color:"|
|align=left|Vadim Boyko
|align=left|Independent
|
|26.19%
|-
| colspan="5" style="background-color:#E9E9E9;"|
|- style="font-weight:bold"
| colspan="3" style="text-align:left;" | Total
| 
| 100%
|-
| colspan="5" style="background-color:#E9E9E9;"|
|- style="font-weight:bold"
| colspan="4" |Source:
|
|}

1995

|-
! colspan=2 style="background-color:#E9E9E9;text-align:left;vertical-align:top;" |Candidate
! style="background-color:#E9E9E9;text-align:left;vertical-align:top;" |Party
! style="background-color:#E9E9E9;text-align:right;" |Votes
! style="background-color:#E9E9E9;text-align:right;" |%
|-
|style="background-color:"|
|align=left|Vitaly Sevastyanov
|align=left|Communist Party
|
|27.61%
|-
|style="background-color:#2C299A"|
|align=left|Konstantin Zatulin
|align=left|Congress of Russian Communities
|
|19.67%
|-
|style="background-color:#1C1A0D"|
|align=left|Vadim Boyko (incumbent)
|align=left|Forward, Russia!
|
|16.48%
|-
|style="background-color:"|
|align=left|Leonid Teleleyko
|align=left|Yabloko
|
|6.32%
|-
|style="background-color:"|
|align=left|Sergey Kovalev
|align=left|Liberal Democratic Party
|
|5.19%
|-
|style="background-color:#F21A29"|
|align=left|Aleksandr Shcherbakov
|align=left|Trade Unions and Industrialists – Union of Labour
|
|3.12%
|-
|style="background-color:"|
|align=left|Yevgeny Shulik
|align=left|Agrarian Party
|
|2.20%
|-
|style="background-color:"|
|align=left|Andrey Kaspinsky
|align=left|Independent
|
|2.18%
|-
|style="background-color:"|
|align=left|Dmitry Yakushev
|align=left|Independent
|
|1.87%
|-
|style="background-color:"|
|align=left|Vladimir Gritsan
|align=left|Independent
|
|1.57%
|-
|style="background-color:"|
|align=left|Vladimir Serebrennikov
|align=left|Independent
|
|1.42%
|-
|style="background-color:#2998D5"|
|align=left|Eduard Sharifov
|align=left|Russian All-People's Movement
|
|1.28%
|-
|style="background-color:#FF8201"|
|align=left|Sergey Shelest
|align=left|Christian-Democratic Union - Christians of Russia
|
|1.08%
|-
|style="background-color:#DA2021"|
|align=left|Aleksandr Vorobyev
|align=left|Ivan Rybkin Bloc
|
|1.07%
|-
|style="background-color:#000000"|
|colspan=2 |against all
|
|7.32%
|-
| colspan="5" style="background-color:#E9E9E9;"|
|- style="font-weight:bold"
| colspan="3" style="text-align:left;" | Total
| 
| 100%
|-
| colspan="5" style="background-color:#E9E9E9;"|
|- style="font-weight:bold"
| colspan="4" |Source:
|
|}

1999

|-
! colspan=2 style="background-color:#E9E9E9;text-align:left;vertical-align:top;" |Candidate
! style="background-color:#E9E9E9;text-align:left;vertical-align:top;" |Party
! style="background-color:#E9E9E9;text-align:right;" |Votes
! style="background-color:#E9E9E9;text-align:right;" |%
|-
|style="background-color:"|
|align=left|Vitaly Sevastyanov (incumbent)
|align=left|Communist Party
|
|30.43%
|-
|style="background-color:"|
|align=left|Viktor Krokhmal
|align=left|Independent
|
|22.60%
|-
|style="background-color:#3B9EDF"|
|align=left|Konstantin Zatulin
|align=left|Fatherland – All Russia
|
|12.17%
|-
|style="background-color:#C62B55"|
|align=left|Konstantin Zakharchenko
|align=left|Peace, Labour, May
|
|6.66%
|-
|style="background-color:"|
|align=left|Leonid Teleleyko
|align=left|Independent
|
|5.24%
|-
|style="background-color:#020266"|
|align=left|Aleksandr Kravtsov
|align=left|Russian Socialist Party
|
|5.02%
|-
|style="background-color:"|
|align=left|Larisa Kanashkina
|align=left|Independent
|
|2.22%
|-
|style="background-color:"|
|align=left|Gennady Pristav
|align=left|Independent
|
|1.53%
|-
|style="background-color:"|
|align=left|Darya Mitina
|align=left|Independent
|
|1.45%
|-
|style="background-color:"|
|align=left|Igor Usachev
|align=left|Independent
|
|0.78%
|-
|style="background-color:#000000"|
|colspan=2 |against all
|
|9.92%
|-
| colspan="5" style="background-color:#E9E9E9;"|
|- style="font-weight:bold"
| colspan="3" style="text-align:left;" | Total
| 
| 100%
|-
| colspan="5" style="background-color:#E9E9E9;"|
|- style="font-weight:bold"
| colspan="4" |Source:
|
|}

2003

|-
! colspan=2 style="background-color:#E9E9E9;text-align:left;vertical-align:top;" |Candidate
! style="background-color:#E9E9E9;text-align:left;vertical-align:top;" |Party
! style="background-color:#E9E9E9;text-align:right;" |Votes
! style="background-color:#E9E9E9;text-align:right;" |%
|-
|style="background-color:"|
|align=left|Sergey Shishkarev
|align=left|Rodina
|
|18.98%
|-
|style="background-color:"|
|align=left|Sergey Yaryshev
|align=left|Independent
|
|13.82%
|-
|style="background-color:"|
|align=left|Ilya Kochyan
|align=left|United Russia
|
|10.85%
|-
|style="background-color:"|
|align=left|Nina Zatsepina
|align=left|Independent
|
|9.19%
|-
|style="background-color: " |
|align=left|Konstantin Shirshov
|align=left|Communist Party
|
|7.98%
|-
|style="background-color:"|
|align=left|Mikhail Kovalyuk
|align=left|Independent
|
|7.81%
|-
|style="background-color:"|
|align=left|Anatoly Vysochin
|align=left|Independent
|
|4.92%
|-
|style="background-color:"|
|align=left|Aleksandr Belichenko
|align=left|Liberal Democratic Party
|
|3.29%
|-
|style="background-color:"|
|align=left|Sergey Panchenko
|align=left|Yabloko
|
|2.64%
|-
|style="background-color:"|
|align=left|Pavel Beloglazov
|align=left|Independent
|
|2.02%
|-
|style="background-color:"|
|align=left|Vladimir Savchenko
|align=left|Independent
|
|1.23%
|-
|style="background-color:#00A1FF"|
|align=left|Semyon Kuznetsov
|align=left|Party of Russia's Rebirth-Russian Party of Life
|
|0.96%
|-
|style="background-color:"|
|align=left|Lyudmila Sergeyeva
|align=left|Independent
|
|0.87%
|-
|style="background-color:#164C8C"|
|align=left|Dmitry Gerasimov
|align=left|United Russian Party Rus'
|
|0.34%
|-
|style="background-color:#000000"|
|colspan=2 |against all
|
|13.15%
|-
| colspan="5" style="background-color:#E9E9E9;"|
|- style="font-weight:bold"
| colspan="3" style="text-align:left;" | Total
| 
| 100%
|-
| colspan="5" style="background-color:#E9E9E9;"|
|- style="font-weight:bold"
| colspan="4" |Source:
|
|}

2016

|-
! colspan=2 style="background-color:#E9E9E9;text-align:left;vertical-align:top;" |Candidate
! style="background-color:#E9E9E9;text-align:left;vertical-align:top;" |Party
! style="background-color:#E9E9E9;text-align:right;" |Votes
! style="background-color:#E9E9E9;text-align:right;" |%
|-
|style="background-color: " |
|align=left|Vladimir Sinyagovsky
|align=left|United Russia
|
|70.52%
|-
|style="background-color:"|
|align=left|Aleksey Trenin
|align=left|Communist Party
|
|8.36%
|-
|style="background-color:"|
|align=left|Valery Khot
|align=left|Liberal Democratic Party
|
|6.46%
|-
|style="background-color:"|
|align=left|Mikhail Yerokhin
|align=left|A Just Russia
|
|4.71%
|-
|style="background:"| 
|align=left|Olga Zaruba
|align=left|Communists of Russia
|
|4.15%
|-
|style="background-color:"|
|align=left|Vladimir Shturkin
|align=left|Rodina
|
|2.14%
|-
|style="background-color:"|
|align=left|Yevgeny Vitishko
|align=left|Yabloko
|
|2.13%
|-
| colspan="5" style="background-color:#E9E9E9;"|
|- style="font-weight:bold"
| colspan="3" style="text-align:left;" | Total
| 
| 100%
|-
| colspan="5" style="background-color:#E9E9E9;"|
|- style="font-weight:bold"
| colspan="4" |Source:
|
|}

2021

|-
! colspan=2 style="background-color:#E9E9E9;text-align:left;vertical-align:top;" |Candidate
! style="background-color:#E9E9E9;text-align:left;vertical-align:top;" |Party
! style="background-color:#E9E9E9;text-align:right;" |Votes
! style="background-color:#E9E9E9;text-align:right;" |%
|-
|style="background-color: " |
|align=left|Sergey Altukhov
|align=left|United Russia
|
|64.30%
|-
|style="background-color:"|
|align=left|Vitaly Pronkin
|align=left|Communist Party
|
|11.29%
|-
|style="background-color:"|
|align=left|Sergey Sazonov
|align=left|A Just Russia — For Truth
|
|5.26%
|-
|style="background-color: " |
|align=left|Yevgeny Kapustin
|align=left|New People
|
|3.98%
|-
|style="background-color:"|
|align=left|Viktor Ivanov
|align=left|Liberal Democratic Party
|
|3.12%
|-
|style="background-color: "|
|align=left|Sergey Koltunov
|align=left|Party of Pensioners
|
|2.32%
|-
|style="background-color: "|
|align=left|Pavel Naumenko
|align=left|Party of Growth
|
|2.27%
|-
|style="background-color: "|
|align=left|Tatyana Sibiryakova
|align=left|Russian Party of Freedom and Justice
|
|1.68%
|-
|style="background-color:"|
|align=left|Yulia Kovaleva
|align=left|The Greens
|
|1.47%
|-
|style="background-color:"|
|align=left|Sergey Plekhanov
|align=left|Rodina
|
|0.96%
|-
|style="background-color: "|
|align=left|Eduard Kunayev
|align=left|Yabloko
|
|0.81%
|-
|style="background-color:"|
|align=left|Albert Yenikeyev
|align=left|Civic Platform
|
|0.75%
|-
| colspan="5" style="background-color:#E9E9E9;"|
|- style="font-weight:bold"
| colspan="3" style="text-align:left;" | Total
| 
| 100%
|-
| colspan="5" style="background-color:#E9E9E9;"|
|- style="font-weight:bold"
| colspan="4" |Source:
|
|}

Notes

References

Russian legislative constituencies
Politics of Krasnodar Krai